Hǎitángwān (海棠湾) may refer to:

Haitang Bay, in Sanya, Hainan, China
Haitangwan (town), town in Sanya, Hainan, China